David John Matthews (born January 9, 1967) is an American singer-songwriter and musician. He is best known as the lead vocalist, songwriter, and guitarist for the Dave Matthews Band (DMB). Matthews was born in Johannesburg, and moved frequently among South Africa, the United Kingdom, and the United States while growing up. Matthews started playing acoustic guitar at the age of nine.

From 1991 to 2003, Matthews predominantly focused on songwriting and performing with the Dave Matthews Band, which he started in Charlottesville, Virginia, in 1991. He also has done various solo performances and produced other records. During the period from 2000 to 2010, his band sold more tickets and earned more money than any other act in North America. The band's 2012 album Away from the World made them the only group to have six consecutive studio albums debut at number one on the Billboard charts. This record was extended to seven consecutive number one albums with the 2018 release, Come Tomorrow.

In addition to music, Matthews has had multiple acting roles. He has also won two Grammy Awards: one with the Dave Matthews Band in 1997 for Best Rock Vocal Performance by a Duo or Group ("So Much to Say") and one in 2004 for Best Male Rock Vocal Performance ("Gravedigger") from his solo album.

Early life
David John Matthews was born in Johannesburg, the third of four children of parents John and Val Matthews. At age two, Matthews moved with his family to Yorktown Heights, New York, where his father, a physicist, started working for IBM.

In 1974, the Matthews family moved to Cambridge, England for a year, then returned to New York, where his father died from lung cancer in 1977 when Matthews was ten years old. At some point, while residing in New York, Matthews attended his first concert, when his mother took him to a performance by Pete Seeger. The family returned to Johannesburg in 1977.

Matthews naturalized as a U.S. citizen in 1980.

Upon Matthews's graduation from secondary school in 1985, he was faced with conscription into the South African military just as civil disobedience to the practice was becoming widespread. As a Quaker (and consequently pacifist), Matthews left South Africa to avoid service.

Matthews moved to New York in 1986 where he worked for IBM for a short time, then joined his mother that same year in Charlottesville, Virginia, a town Matthews's family had lived in before he was born. In Charlottesville, he became part of the local music community. Although Matthews had started playing the guitar at age nine, it was only in Charlottesville that he started performing publicly. Through a mutual friend, Nic Cappon, Matthews met local star (and future collaborator) Tim Reynolds. In time, Reynolds had Matthews join him on stage, and Matthews was persuaded to record some of his own songs. This led to his first professional musical gig at a modern dance performance by the Miki Liszt Dance Company, based at McGuffey Art Center in Charlottesville, singing "Meaningful Love", composed by John D'earth and Dawn Thompson. In 1991, he hatched the idea to form his own band. Before recording his first demo, Matthews bartended at Miller's in Charlottesville.

Formation of Dave Matthews Band 
After writing his first few songs, including "I'll Back You Up", "The Song That Jane Likes" and "Recently", Matthews formed Dave Matthews Band in early 1991 with LeRoi Moore, Carter Beauford, Stefan Lessard, Peter Griesar (who left the band in 1993), and Boyd Tinsley while working at Miller's as a bartender. The band's first show was on March 14, 1991, as part of a benefit for the Middle East Children's Alliance at Trax Nightclub in Charlottesville, Virginia.

Matthews's older sister Anne, who lived in South Africa, was murdered by her husband in early 1994. Her husband then died by suicide on or around January 27 of that year. The event had a profound effect on Matthews's outlook on life and was referenced in a few of his songs. On January 29, 1994, he performed with Tim Reynolds at the Wetlands in New York, where he dedicated that performance "to her [Anne's] memory". Dave Matthews Band's Under the Table and Dreaming, released later that year, was dedicated to her. Anne Matthews was survived by her two children, and they traveled to the United States following her death. Dave and his younger sister Jane (after whom the Dave Matthews Band song "The Song That Jane Likes" is named) took responsibility for the children's upbringing.

Other musical work

 
Matthews focused primarily on songwriting and performances with the Dave Matthews Band from 1990 to 2003. DMB is an artistic blend of acoustic guitar, bass, sax, drums and fiddle music. In 1994, DMB signed with RCA Records. Since that period, he has occasionally ventured outside the band in various solo performances and records.
Matthews sang on the track "Sing Along" on Blue Man Group's second album The Complex in 2003. Later that year he released the solo album Some Devil, which went platinum; its single "Gravedigger" won a Grammy Award in 2004. Dave Mathews drew motivation for this song from the long-running Monster Jam celebrity Grave Digger. To support the album, Matthews toured with a group of musicians (many of whom performed on "Some Devil") under the name Dave Matthews & Friends.

Dave often collaborates with banjoist Béla Fleck. Fleck is the frontman and namesake of Béla Fleck and the Flecktones; Matthews appears as guest vocalist with the band on their 1998 release, Left of Cool. Both Fleck and the Flecktones' bassist Victor Wooten have made numerous live appearances and in studio with the Dave Matthews Band. Wooten soloed in the second part of the Daniel Lanois song "The Maker", and also in "#41" on the 1998 live album Live in Chicago. The Flecktones also opened for DMB on several tours. Matthews performed a duet with Emmylou Harris on "My Antonia" on her 2000 album Red Dirt Girl. They also appeared together on the musical television show CMT Crossroads, where the two performed Matthews's "Gravedigger" and the folk song "Long Black Veil".

Matthews played a cover of Neil Young's song "The Needle and the Damage Done" at the 2010 tribute MusiCares Person of the Year, honoring Young on January 29, 2010.
The Dave Matthews Band opened for the Rolling Stones on their Bridges to Babylon Tour (1997–1998), and Matthews sang "Wild Horses" and "Memory Motel" with Mick Jagger.

Acting
Before he was known as a musician, Dave Matthews was an amateur actor, appearing onstage in several productions at Charlottesville's Offstage Theatre and Live Arts theater in the early 1990s; the role for which he is best remembered is as a used car salesman in Offstage Theatre's "Just Say No," directed by John Quinn, co-starring Kylie Suture. He played Will Coleman in the 2003 adaptation of the novel Where the Red Fern Grows. In 2005, he played in Because of Winn-Dixie as Otis, a man who works at a pet store and plays guitar.
In 2007, Matthews appeared briefly in the movie I Now Pronounce You Chuck and Larry, where he plays a homosexual salesman. In 2008, he appeared in the Adam Sandler movie You Don't Mess with the Zohan as a racist redneck character named James. He also had a significant role in Lake City with Sissy Spacek and Troy Garity, in which he portrays the character Red. He was also in three movies in 2011: The Other Side with Giovanni Ribisi and Jason Lee, In the Woods, starring Debra Winger and Terrence Howard, and the Adam Sandler/Jennifer Aniston comedy Just Go with It.

In 2007, Matthews guest-starred in the medical-drama series House in the episode "Half-Wit". He played a piano-playing musical savant who had the two hemispheres of his brain severed from each other in order to recover from his epilepsy, but at the expense of his musical abilities. Dave had a piano double for the complex pieces, but played the simpler pieces himself. In the season one episode of House, "Love Hurts", the song "Some Devil" can be heard playing at the end. In another episode, one of the tracks from Stand Up, "You Might Die Trying" was played in the season five episode, "Not Cancer".

The fifth time Matthews appeared as musical guest on Saturday Night Live in November 2009 (which was also the fourth time the Dave Matthews Band appeared on the show), he made an appearance as Ozzy Osbourne in a skit called "The Mellow Show". Bill Hader impersonated Matthews in the same skit.

Matthews was also a cast member and performer in the popular music documentary Before the Music Dies. In 2018, Matthews guest-starred on Pete the Cat as the voice of Gustavo's father, a platypus.

Other activities
In 1999, Matthews purchased more than 10 acres of land in Albemarle County, Virginia, known as Blenheim Farm, to preserve its historical significance. He later decided to plant grapes on the property, since it is located within both the Virginia and Monticello viticultural areas. Blenheim Vineyards was founded in 2000, and currently produces 5,500 cases of wine per year, including its signature Petit Verdot and several special edition wines that have featured unique labels with drawings by Matthews.

In 2011, Matthews collaborated with wine makers Steve Reeder and Sean McKenzie in creating the Dreaming Tree Wines.

In April 2012, Matthews was credited as producer on the documentary Last Call at the Oasis, directed by Jessica Yu.

In early 2013, Matthews participated in a jam session at Blade Studios in Shreveport, Louisiana, with Jakob Dylan, Charlie Sexton, Blade studios co-owner Brady Blade, and Sexton's brother Will. This led to the formation of a band named The Nauts with Matthews, Dylan, Blade, and the Sexton brothers as members. However, there has been no news regarding an album release since that jam session.

On May 16, 2020, in the midst of the COVID-19 quarantine, Matthews appeared streaming on the virtual graduation ceremonies for the University of Virginia. He wished students his best and said "it is now your small opportunity to make the world a better place, as you see fit." He then sang the song "Singing from the Windows".

Personal life
Dave Matthews married longtime girlfriend Jennifer Ashley Harper in 2000. They have twin daughters born in 2001, and a son born in 2007. They reside in Seattle. In a 2001 interview, Matthews stated that he was agnostic.  He joined the Farm Aid board of directors in 2001, to serve alongside fellow musicians Willie Nelson, John Mellencamp and Neil Young to raise money for family farmers in the United States.

Politics
Matthews published an Internet video before the 2000 U.S. presidential election, urging viewers to vote without advocating any candidate. He mentioned only Ralph Nader by name, and updated fans about the recording sessions for Everyday. Although his music often explores political and social issues, Matthews refrained from public campaigning for presidential candidates until 2004. He cast his support strongly with Democratic nominee John Kerry, performing at political events including the Vote for Change tour.

Matthews also supported Barack Obama for president in 2008, both in the primaries and in the general election. On April 6, 2008, he and Tim Reynolds played a concert titled "Change Rocks" at Indiana University to encourage students to register to vote. The tickets were distributed by the Obama campaign. Questions regarding his citizenship were answered by advertisements and videos on YouTube, where he says he is a "real American" and a "real Virginian," stating that "real Virginians get out and vote." Although bereaved by the loss of band co-founder and saxophonist LeRoi Moore on August 19, 2008, he and Tim Reynolds played for the Democratic National Convention delegates on Sunday, August 24, at Red Rocks, and again with Reynolds at Virginia Commonwealth University on October 26, 2008, among other places. Matthews has often supported environmental initiatives, such as biofuel availability and the fight against global climate change.

On September 21, 2009, Matthews stated that some of President Barack Obama's harsher critics were motivated by his race, and stated that he "sees it [racism] everywhere" in the United States. Matthews is also a strong supporter of gay rights and participated in "Love Unites Shepard Fairey Equality Project", a gay marriage advocacy project.

On May 10, 2012, Matthews entertained a sellout crowd at the Paramount Theatre in Seattle where President Obama was hosting a campaign fundraiser.

In a September 28, 2015, interview with Rolling Stone, Matthews said that "when I hear someone like Bernie Sanders talking, I think there's a hope." Matthews performed at a San Francisco rally for Sanders during the 2016 presidential primaries and later, during the general election campaign. He was a major donor to the 2017 gubernatorial campaign of progressive Charlottesville politician Tom Perriello.

On October 30, 2021, Matthews performed at a Democratic get out the vote event in Charlottesville VA with Virginia gubernatorial candidate Terry McAuliffe. During the 2022 election campaign, Matthews performed at campaign events for Democratic candidates Tim Ryan in Ohio and John Fetterman in Pennsylvania.

Awards and accolades

Grammy Awards
 1997: Best Rock Vocal Performance by a Duo or Group – "So Much to Say", Dave Matthews Band
 2004: Best Male Rock Vocal Performance – "Gravedigger", Dave Matthews

ASCAP Film and Television Music Awards
Most Performed Song from a Motion Picture – "Where Are You Going" (for Mr. Deeds)
Dave Matthews was awarded D.M.A. honoris causa by Haverford College on May 15, 2005.
2002: Matthews was the recipient of the Orville Gibson Award for Best Acoustic Guitarist.

Discography

Studio albums

 Under the Table and Dreaming (1994)
 Crash (1996)
 Before These Crowded Streets (1998)
 Everyday (2001)
 Busted Stuff (2002)
 Some Devil (2003)
 Stand Up (2005)
 Imagine We Were (2005) – as Tribe of Heaven; originally recorded in 1989
 Big Whiskey & the GrooGrux King (2009)
 Away from the World (2012)
 Come Tomorrow (2018)
 Walk Around the Moon (2023)

Live Solo albums
 Live at Sweet Briar College (2016); originally recorded in 1996

Digital downloads
Two shows have been released as part of the Dave Matthews Band's DMBlive series available only for online download.

 Dave Matthews Benaroya Hall, Seattle, WA (October 24, 2002) – 2008
 Dave Matthews China Club, NYC (01/09/2004) – 2008

Live albums with Tim Reynolds
 Live at Luther College – (1999)
 Live at Radio City – (2007)
 DMBLive. Prism Coffeehouse, Charlottesville, VA (04.22.1993) – (2008)
 DMBLive. Appalachian State University, Boone, NC (03.29.2003) – (2008)
 Live in Las Vegas – (2010)
 Live Trax Vol. 23 Whittemore Center Arena, Durham, NH (02.19.96) – (2012)
 Live Trax Vol. 24 Spartanburg Memorial, Spartanburg, SC (02.08.97) – (2012)
 DMBLive. Memphis, Richmond, VA (06.13.1993) – (2012)
 DMBLive. J.T. Kingsbury Hall, Salt Lake City, UT (03.03.1999) – (2014)
 Live Trax Vol. 41 Berkeley Community Theater, Berkeley, CA (03.13.99) – (2017)
 Live Trax Vol. 48 The Birchmere, Alexandria, VA (08.25.94) – (2019)
 Live Trax Vol. 49 Constellation Brands - Marvin Sands Performing Arts Center, Canandaigua, NY, (06.18.19) – (2019)

Singles

Guest singles

A "I What What" charted as an album cut in 2008 before being released as a single in 2009

Videography

Video albums

Collaborations
"Eleanor" and "See Jane" (1994), off the Shannon Worrell album Three Wishes
"Communication" and "Trouble and Strife" (1998), off the Béla Fleck and the Flecktones album Left of Cool
"Love Of My Life" (1999), off the Santana album Supernatural (Santana album)
"My Antonia" (2000) off the Emmylou Harris studio album Red Dirt Girl, where Dave duets with Emmylou on her composition
"For You" (2002) off the We Were Soldiers soundtrack with Johnny Cash
"Iwoya" (2002) off the Angélique Kidjo album Black Ivory Soul
"Joyful Girl" (2002) off the Soulive album Next
"Sing Along" (2003) off the Blue Man Group album The Complex with music video
"Tremendous Brunettes" (2005) off the Mike Doughty album Haughty Melodic
"Love Is The Only Way" (2006) off the Robert Randolph and the Family Band album Colorblind
"Work It Out" produced by DJ Nu-Mark (2006) off the Jurassic 5 album Feedback
"Fat Man in the Bathtub" (2008) off the Little Feat album "Join the Band"
"I'm Alive" (2008) off the Kenny Chesney album Lucky Old Sun
"Mamma Boulet" (2008) off the Dave Grant album Bubbalon by Bass
"Caveman", "Sleep" & "Overdue" (2009) off the Danny Barnes album Pizza Box
"Tomorrow Never Knows" (2010), off the Herbie Hancock album The Imagine Project
"You Should Know Me", "Oh, Bangladesh" & "And He Slayed Her" (2010) off the Liz Phair album Funstyle
"All the Same"(2011) off the Vieux Farka Touré album – The Secret
"A Pirate Looks at Forty" (2012) with Jack Johnson and Tim Reynolds, off the live album Jack Johnson and Friends – Best of Kokua Festival
"Walk of Shame" (2012) with Jimmy Fallon, off the comedy album Blow Your Pants Off
"Take Me to Tomorrow" (2013) off the John Denver tribute album – The Music Is You: A Tribute to John Denver
"Forsaken Savior" (2013) off the Gov't Mule album Shout!
"Sweetheart" (2018), off the Sarah White album "High Flyer"

See also
List of celebrities who own wineries and vineyards

References

External links
 
 The Warehouse: The Official Dave Matthews Band Fan Association
 
 
 

 
1967 births
Living people
20th-century American singers
21st-century American singers
Alumni of St Stithians College
American agnostics
American humanitarians
American male singers
American pacifists
Record producers from New York (state)
American rock guitarists
American male guitarists
American rock singers
American Quakers
Dave Matthews Band members
Grammy Award winners
American LGBT rights activists
Singers from Virginia
Musicians from Charlottesville, Virginia
People from Yorktown Heights, New York
South African emigrants to the United States
Guitarists from Virginia
20th-century American guitarists
American people of South African descent
White South African people